Cyberknife (foaled 14 March 2019) is an American Thoroughbred racehorse who has won multiple Grade I events as a three-year-old in 2022 including the Arkansas Derby and Haskell Stakes.

Background
Cyberknife is a chestnut colt that was bred in Kentucky by Kenneth L. and Sarah K. Ramsey. His sire is Gun Runner, the 2017 American Horse of the Year and stands at Three Chimneys Farm and his dam is Awesome Flower who was sired by the 2005 Travers Stakes winner Flower Alley.

He was bought by Joe Hardoon on behalf of Al Gold's Gold Square, for US$400,000 from the Kenneth L. and Sarah K. Ramsey's Ramsey Farm consignment at the 2020 Fasig-Tipton Selected Yearlings Showcase. He is the fourth foal and first stakes winner for Awesome Flower.

Racing career

2021: Two-year-old season

Cyberknife began his racing career on 25 September in a Maiden Special Weight event over 6 furlongs at Churchill Downs. Starting as the 6/5 favorite in a field of nine began awkwardly recovering to stalk the leader then forging ahead three wide while shifting inwards and bumping Hoist the Gold in upper stretch, then dueled while managing a narrow margin from that rival through the lane, and prevailing. However, after a stewards inquiry into the incident in the stretch Cyberknife was disqualified and placed second.

On 5 November Cyberknife returned to the track at Churchill Downs in a Maiden Special Weight event over  furlongs. Starting as the short 2/5 odds-on favorite Cyberknife tracked the pace early, was in the four path into the lane, made a bid down the lane, drifted out a bit then lugged in and did not have enough in the final stages to defeat Classic Moment.

A change of venue and a change of jockey for his third attempt to break his maiden Cyberknife was moved to the Fair Grounds in New Orleans where he on 26 December he broke his maiden over the  miles distance holding off Jeeper by  length.

2022: Three-year-old season

On 22 January Cyberknife faced eight other rivals in his first run in a graded event, the Grade III Lecomte Stakes at the Fair Grounds. Cyberknife settled off of the pace four wide, inched closer in the five path and outside of rivals around the far turn to attempt a bid approaching the lane, but flattened out in upper stretch finishing sixth beaten by over 10 lengths.

On 19 February Cyberknife dropped in class to an Allowance Optional Claiming event over  miles and easily dispatched his 9 foes as the 9/5 favorite winning by three lengths.

In his next start on 2 April Cyberknife starting at odds of nearly 6/1 won the prestigious Grade I Arkansas Derby at Oaklawn Park by  lengths over Barber Road and the game filly Secret Oath securing 100 points for the Kentucky Derby thus qualifying for the event. Trainer Brad Cox commented after the event, "This is a good colt. We've liked him for a long, long, time. I was a little taken back by his Lecomte but he ran very well in the allowance race. He's not polished mentally but he's getting there all the time. The more he races, the better he'll get. He's starting to put it all together."

In the Kentucky Derby Cyberknife failed to fire, finishing well back in eighteenth place after being fanned eight wide into the first turn. Connections regrouped after this start trying to understand what caused Cyberknife's poor run.

One month later Cyberknife was entered in the Grade III Matt Winn Stakes and starting as the 1/2 odds-on favorite prevailed by the slimmest of noses over Howling Time in an epic battle down the Churchill Downs homestretch. Jockey Florent Geroux comment after the event, "He was traveling well and (Howling Time) was really game on my inside. We were battling the whole stretch. I couldn’t tell which one of us won, but I’m glad it was Cyberknife."

Six weeks later Cyberknife travelled to the Jersey Shore track of Monmouth Park for the Grade I Haskell Stakes. Facing a tough field including undefeated Jack Christopher, Cyberknife was made 8/1 fourth pick in a field of eight. With a patient ride by regular rider Florent Geroux, Cyberknife surged to a head victory in a track-record time of 1:46.24 for  miles over the Bob Baffert-trained Taiba with Jack Christopher (3/5on) in third place. Al Gold, whose Gold Square owns Cyberknife calls Monmouth Park his home away from home commented, "I have a lot of great memories here, and this is the best horse I've ever had. It's his second grade 1. It's a special feeling. There are no words to describe it."

The Travers Stakes on 27 August attracted a very strong field, including the top three finishers in the Kentucky Derby (Rich Strike, Epicenter and Zandon), Preakness winner Early Voting and Cyberknife. Cyberknife started as the 9/2-second favorite, set moderate fractions for the first three-quarters of a mile. Epicenter then began his move on the outside, taking the lead at the quarter-pole. He continued to draw away down the stretch to win by  lengths with Cyberknife finishing second, with Zandon in third and Rich Strike fourth.

Statistics

An (*) asterisk after the odds means Cyberknife was the post-time favorite.

Breeding

On 7 August 2022 that Cyberknife's breeding rights had been acquired by Spendthrift Farm. Owner Gold commented "I'm excited about teaming with Spendthrift on Cyberknife, and I look forward to watching him have a productive stallion career."

Pedigree

References

2019 racehorse births
Racehorses bred in Kentucky
Racehorses trained in the United States
Thoroughbred family 8-h
American Grade 1 Stakes winners
Horse racing track record setters